Nanango  is a rural town and locality in the South Burnett Region, Queensland, Australia.

Geography 

Sandy Creek meanders through the town. The locality is part of the Burnett River catchment. The productive lands of the catchment feature sedimentary floodplains. The rich fertile soils of the floodplains are the agricultural and resource backbone of the region.  While there are benefits of the flooding there are also risks including the loss of vegetation in riparian zones, biosecurity issues and spread of weed species.

History
The original inhabitants of the area were the Aboriginal people belonging to the Wakka Wakka (or Waka Waka) people. The area was used as a gateway to the bunya nut festivals, where Aboriginal people would travel from as far away as the Clarence River in northern New South Wales and the Maranoa River to feast on bunya nuts from the bunya trees.

The area around Nanango was first settled by Europeans in 1847 by John Borthwick and William Oliver from Ipswich taking up pastures for sheep farming. Oliver selected an area of more than 500 km² that comprised four blocks – Coolabunia, Booie, Broadwater and Nanango.

The first commercial establishment at the present site of Nanango township was Goode's Inn, founded by prospector Jacob Goode in July 1848. The inn served travellers journeying from Brisbane and Limestone (now known as Ipswich) and became the meeting place for early residents of Taromeo, Tarong and Nanango stations. The town of Nanango quickly developed around it. Goode's original rough slab structure met the licensing conditions as his first licence for the "Burnett Hotel situated at Barambah Creek" was given at a special licensing meeting on 26 April 1849.

Nanango claims to be the fourth oldest town in Queensland, but such claims depend on how the age of the town is determined. In some cases, this is by the first settlement (usually for pastoral purposes in or near the eventual town) or it might be date of survey for a town plan. Nanango's claim to be fourth oldest is based on the first establishment of commercial premises (e.g. store or hotel), which is Goode's Inn in 1848. On this basis, it is the fourth following Ipswich (then called Limestone), Drayton, and Maryborough. However, Nanango was not surveyed for a town until 1861, and several other towns were surveyed before that.

Goode's Inn Post Office opened on 5 January 1852. It was renamed Burnett Inn by 1855 and Nanango on 1 July 1859.
 
The name Nanango has evolved from the Wakka Wakka word "Nunangi". There is dispute over the origins of the name Nanango- the word means "large watering hole" or was also the name of a local Aboriginal elder at the time of settlement. The original settlement was called "Noogoonida" by the Aboriginals, meaning "place where the waters gather together".

Nanango State School opened on 1 January 1866. In January 1955, it was expanded to have  a secondary school department, an arrangement that continued until Nanango State High School opened on 25 January 1982.

Beef, dairy and timber (in particular the valuable red cedar) were the primary early industries in the area. The discovery of gold at the Seven Mile Diggings near Nanango in 1867 precipitated a gold rush, and consequently a local population boom, however the gold deposits were found to be meagre. At one time the population included 700 miners, many of whom were Chinese.

Land in Nanango was open for selection on 17 April 1877;  were available.

A second population boom occurred when the Brisbane Valley railway line was extended to Yarraman in 1911. Nanango railway station became the terminus of a branch off the South Burnett railway line at Kingaroy on 13 November 1911. The  (14-mile) missing rail link between Nanango and Yarraman, although planned was never built.

St Patrick's Catholic Primary School was established on 28 April 1912 by the Sisters of Mercy.

In February 1913, 1222 acres in areas of 63 to 122 acres of Nanango Station were advertised to be auctioned by Jno Darley and W. Hamilton on behalf of Mr Jas Millis. A map advertising the auction states the Estate was situated 3 to 5 miles from Nanango where there is "an up to date butter factory and public offices". The land is described as mainly creek flats fronting Barker's Creek, rich alluvial and black soil suited to growing lucerne, potatoes, wheat, oats and maize. Some blocks also have access to Meandu Creek as a permanent source for water.

On 29 January 1920, the Nanango War Memorial was unveiled by Major-General Thomas William Glasgow.

A Baptist congregation was formed in Nanango in 1929 and was officially constituted in 1932. The Nanango Baptist Church officially opened at 81 Drayton Street on Saturday 29 February 1936. In 1998 the congregation needed a more spacious church and relocated to a new building at 37 Mount Stanley Road, under the new name of Nanango Community Baptist Church. The old church was sold into private ownership.

After World War I, however, growth levelled off until the early 1970s when the development of the Tarong Power Station led to a third population explosion. McCauley Weir was used as the town's water supply until three additional bores were drilled at the confluence of Barkers Creek and Meandu Creek.

In April 1921, two subdivisions at Nanango and Tarong Estate and Township were advertised for auction by John Darley and Isles, Love and Co. The Tarong Estate, twelve miles from Nanango and Tarong Railway Station offered 25 agricultural farms and 62 town allotments while the Grange Estate, eleven miles from Nanango and 18 miles from Kingaroy in the Parish of Booie offered 15 dairy farms.

Nanango State High School opened on 25 January 1982, having previously been a secondary department attached to Nanango State School.

The Nanango Library opened in 1962.

Heritage listings

Nanango has a number of heritage-listed sites, including:
 George Street: Nanango Butter Factory Building
 30 Henry Street: Nanango Court House
 41 Albert Street: Ringsfield House, a grand country residence and gardens. built by Robin Dods for Mrs Florence Graham in 1908

Economy 
Nanango's principal industries are power generation and coal mining, agriculture, beef and pork production, dairying and milk processing, timber growing and milling, small crops, natural medicine, art and craftwork and tourism.

Education
Nanango State School is a government primary (Early Childhood-6) school for boys and girls at 39 Drayton Street. In 2018, the school had an enrolment of 438 students with 37 teachers (34 full-time equivalent) and 26 non-teaching staff (18 full-time equivalent). It includes a special education program.

St Patrick's Primary School is a Catholic primary (Prep-6) school for boys and girls at 16 Alfred Street. In 2018, the school had an enrolment of 77 students with 9 teachers (7 full-time equivalent) and 8 non-teaching staff (5 full-time equivalent).

In 2018, the school had an enrolment of 522 students with 52 teachers (49 full-time equivalent) and 37 non-teaching staff (28 full-time equivalent). It includes a special education program.

Facilities
Nanango Police Station is at 34 Henry Street.

Nanango Fire Station is at 14 Alfred Street.

Nanango SES Facility is at 29 Grey Street.

Nanango Hospital is a public hospital at 135 Brisbane Street. It has a heliport.

Nanango Ambulance Station is at 95 Drayton Street.

Nanango Cemetery is at 53 Applin Street West.

Nanango Aerodrome is at Racecourse Road.

Amenities

Nanango also has a vigorous cultural and sporting life and is host to several potteries, Art Gallery and many craft outlets. The town also has many clubs and a range of sporting facilities including an RSL, bike, darts, golf, lawn bowling and archery clubs. There are 13 well-maintained parklands in the Shire which naturalists believe are home to 250 different bird species.

Nanango Golf Club has a 18-hole golf course on Millis Way.

The South Burnett Regional Council operates a library in Nanango at 48 Drayton Street.

The Nanango branch of the Queensland Country Women's Association meets at its hall at 59 Fitzroy Street.

The Nanango Baptist Community Church is at 37 Mount Stanley Road.

Nanango Wesleyan Methodist Church is at 55 Cairns Street. It is part of the Wesleyan Methodist Church of Australia.

There are a number of parks in the area:

 Green Park
 Lee Park

 Lions Park

 Pioneer Park

Attractions

Tourists also travel through the town on their way between Rockhampton in the north and Sydney/Melbourne in the south. The central business district features chainsaw sculptures and murals which reflect the town's historical connections with timber-felling, farming and mining.

A great deal of Nanango's colourful history is preserved in its buildings – especially Ringsfield House, a restored circa 1908 Queenslander developed by architect Robin Dods.

Unfortunately a number of fires throughout history have ravaged the CBD of the town, especially the fire of 1940 which destroyed all of the shops on the southern side of Drayton Street from Fitzroy to Henry Street. This has led the CBD to have a "1950s feel" due to the architecture of the time. One building that escaped the ravages of fire was "Nobby's Corner", an example of an old-fashioned corner store with wide verandahs.

Nanango serves as a gateway for exploration of nearby towns. Day trips from the town include the Grapes and Gourmets Drive, Bunya Mountains, Coomba Falls and fossicking at Seven Mile Diggings. The "Great Bunya Drive" was created in 2006 and passes through the township and other regional attractions.

The Nanango Country Markets are featured on the 1st Saturday of every month and are widely recognised as the largest rural markets in SE Queensland. They have on average over 400 stalls, and reportedly in December 2013 had over 800 stalls.

Nanango has a range of accommodation for tourists, including caravan parks and motels.

Events

Nanango has a number of live entertainment venues which regularly host performances by local theatre and musical groups. The Lee Park race track – not far south of the CBD – hosts around 8 meetings each year.

Major annual events include the international Criterium Bike Race (held in Nanango's CBD in February); the Nanango Show (held at the Nanango Showgrounds in April); Nanango Medieval Fest (fourth Saturday in August); Nanango Arts Fest (held over a week in October); the Nanango Country Music Muster (held at the Showgrounds in September); the week-long Mardi Gras (in October), and the Christmas Carnival (in December).

Climate
The area has a similar climate to nearby Kingaroy, however it is described as cooler in winter and more humid.

Notable residents
Deb Frecklington, an Australian politician for the Liberal National Party and an MP in the Parliament of Queensland in 2018
Sam McMahon, an Australian politician for the Country Liberal Party and a Senator for the Northern Territory in the Parliament of Australia in 2019

References

External links

 
 

Sydney Morning Herald travel article, 8 February 2004
Queensland Place Names

Towns in Queensland
South Burnett Region
Localities in Queensland